Epimydia is a monotypic tiger moth genus in the family Erebidae. Its only species, Epimydia dialampra, can be found in mountainous steppe areas in southern Siberia, eastern Yakutia and northern Mongolia. Both the genus and species were first described by Otto Staudinger in 1892. Females are very small and brachypterous.

References

Callimorphina
Moths described in 1892
Monotypic moth genera
Moths of Asia